Terahertz or THz may refer to:

 Terahertz (unit), a unit of frequency, defined as one trillion (1012) cycles per second or 1012 hertz
 Terahertz radiation, electromagnetic waves within the ITU-designated band of frequencies from 0.3 to 3 terahertz
 Terahertz spectroscopy and technology
 Intel TeraHertz, a transistor design

See also 
 Terahertz gap, a band of frequencies in the terahertz region of the electromagnetic spectrum